A ram accelerator is a device for accelerating projectiles or just a single projectile to extremely high speeds using jet-engine-like propulsion cycles based on ramjet or scramjet combustion processes. It is thought to be possible to achieve non-rocket spacelaunch with this technology.

It consists of a long tube (barrel) filled with a mixture of combustible gases with a frangible diaphragm at either end to contain the gases. The projectile is fired by another means (e.g., a light-gas gun or railgun) supersonically through the first diaphragm into the tube. Then the projectile burns the gases as fuel, because it is shaped like a ramjet or scramjet core, and accelerates under jet propulsion. Other physics come into play at higher velocities.

Description
In a normal ramjet, air is compressed between a spike-shaped centerbody and an outer cowling, fuel is added and burned, and high speed exhaust gases are expanded supersonically out of the nozzle to generate thrust.  In a ram accelerator, a projectile having a shape similar to the ramjet centerbody is fired, (often from a conventional gun), into the accelerator barrel, causing compression between the projectile and the barrel's walls.  The barrel contains a pre-mixed gaseous fuel-air mixture.  As the ram accelerator projectile compresses the fuel-air mixture, it is ignited and the combustion is stabilized at the base of the projectile.  The resulting pressure differential generates a prodigious amount of thrust that can accelerate projectiles to in-tube Mach numbers greater than 8.  Thus, if propellant mixtures with a speed of sound of 1000 m/s (e.g. fuel-rich H2-O2 mixtures) are used, muzzle velocities in excess of 8000 m/s are possible.

To span a wide range in a typical ram accelerator system, multiple stages with propellants with different sound speeds are used to maintain high performance. Membranes or diaphragms that are easily punctured by the projectile are used to isolate the propellant stages.  Each section is filled with a different fuel-air mixture chosen so that later sections have higher speeds of sound.  As such, the ram can be maintained at optimal speeds of  Mach 3–5 (relative to the mixture that it travels through) during its entire acceleration period.  Ram accelerators optimized to use supersonic combustion modes can generate even higher velocities (Mach 6-8) due to the ability to combust fuel that is still moving at supersonic speed.

Testing 
Scramjet projectiles were tested in Project HARP in the 1960s.

Advantages
The chief advantage of a ram accelerator over a conventional gun is its scalability.  In a normal gun, maximum pressure is exerted at the time of the charge ignition.  As the projectile moves further down the barrel, the amount of acceleration upon the projectile decreases as the gas behind it expands, eventually reaching amounts trivial enough that a longer barrel is no longer justified .  With a ram accelerator, the projectile is propelled primarily by the pressure generated by the reaction of the propellant gases burning just behind the projectile.  This leads to constant pressure being put both on the gun and the projectile itself.  Consequently, far longer barrels are possible than conventional guns, while still delivering a strong constant acceleration to the projectile.

Uses
Ram accelerators have been proposed as a cheap method to get payloads into space.  Impulsive launched projectiles need some means to circularize their trajectory for orbit insertion, so rockets, such as those designed in the 1960s in Project HARP, are typically incorporated into the projectiles. With multi-stage rocket projectiles the launch cost was estimated at US$500 per kilogram in 2004.

Ram accelerator technology has also been envisioned for military applications such as ultra-long range striking and intercepting capabilities against stationary and on-the-move threats. The fact that the projectile accelerates and travels at very high velocities makes it a perfect alternative to anti-ship warfare, giving it abilities to evade defense systems. Only systems such as railguns could have such striking abilities against high alert threats. Such projectiles could even be integrated into railguns themselves to allow even higher acceleration at a cheaper cost and effectiveness against a wide variety of targets.

Technologies related to a ram accelerator for direct space launch applications are: two-stage gas guns (SHARP), multiple sidewall injection gas guns (JVL), railguns, and coilguns.

Ram accelerators are currently used primarily for research into supersonic combustion. As of July 2007, the Ballistic Flight Group has been promoting commercial investment into the ram accelerator technology. The scram cannon science fiction weapon was inspired by ram accelerators.

See also
Light-gas gun
 Railgun
 Plasma railgun
 Helical railgun
 Coilgun
 Mass driver

External links

Spacecraft propulsion
Artillery by type